Little Miss Pinkerton is a 1943 Our Gang short comedy film directed by Herbert Glazer. It was the 216th Our Gang short (217th episode, 128th talking short, 129th talking episode, and 48th MGM produced episode) that was released.

Synopsis
The janitor of the Greenpoint department store is murdered during a robbery, while Mickey, Froggy, Buckwheat, and Janet witness the crime. The thieves take the boys hostage, but Janet escapes and heads for the police. Alas, no grownup will believe her story, so Janet enlists the aid of the other gang members to rescue the boys and capture the crooks.

Production notes
This is the last Our Gang episode directed by Herbert Glazer, who disappeared into obscurity after that. Edward Cahn returns for the next episode, Three Smart Guys.

This was the third MGM Our Gang short to lose money during its initial release, losing approximately $900 after print and advertising expenses were factored into the budget.

Cast

The Gang
 Janet Burston as Janet
 Bobby Blake as Mickey
 Billy Laughlin as Froggy
 Billie Thomas as Buckwheat

Additional cast
 Robert Ferrero as Paper boy
 Mark Daniels as Photographer
 Robert Emmet O'Connor as Sgt. O'Toole
 Dick Rich as Pete
 Norman Willis as Joe

See also
 Our Gang filmography

References

External links

1943 films
American black-and-white films
Films directed by Herbert Glazer
Metro-Goldwyn-Mayer short films
1943 comedy films
Our Gang films
1943 short films
1940s American films